Paracenobiopelma is a monotypic genus of South American brushed trapdoor spiders containing the single species, Paracenobiopelma gerecormophilum. It was first described in 1952, and has only been found in Brazil. Their closest relatives are found in the genus Sason, which occur in south Asia.

Name
The genus name is combined from the Ancient Greek "para", meaning "near to", and the genus name "Cenobiopelma", now renamed "Oligoxystre". "Cenobiopelma" is derived from the Ancient Greek roots ceno "evacuation", bio "life", and pelma "sole of the foot".

The species name is derived from the roots ger "to carry", cormo "tree trunk" and philum "to like".

References

Barychelidae
Monotypic Mygalomorphae genera
Spiders of Brazil